, also known by his Chinese style name , was a politician and bureaucrat of the Ryukyu Kingdom.

Misato Anman was born to an aristocrat family called Mō-uji Misato Dunchi. He was the eldest son of Takehara An'i.

Misato was elected as Sanshikan in 1725. Toyokawa Seiei wrote  based on Liuyu Yanyi at Sai On's behest in order to regulate moral behavior with Chinese Confucianism. It was identified as textbook by law in 1732. The law was jointly signed by Misato, Sai On, Ie Chōjo, all were members of Sanshikan, and later the sessei Chatan Chōki. But it was strongly resisted by pro-Japanese faction, including Heshikiya Chōbin and one of Misato's younger brother Tomoyose Anjō. But the letter was handed over to the king. Both Heshikiya and Tomoyose were executed by crucifixion, and their offspring were exiled.

Misato was not implicated in this incident and his descendants survived. He retired in the next year.

References

Ueekata
Sanshikan
People of the Ryukyu Kingdom
Ryukyuan people
17th-century Ryukyuan people
18th-century Ryukyuan people
1669 births
1744 deaths